Ajmal P A(born 12 November 1995) is an Indian professional football player who plays as a goalkeeper for I-League side Gokulam Kerala FC.

Career

Gokulam Kerala FC 
Ajmal signed his first senior contract for Gokulam Kerala on 2017. Ajmal was signed for 2017-18 I-League season, which was the clubs' first season in the league. Ajmal was constantly benched and didn't made any appearance for the club for three continuous seasons of I-League. Ajmal finally made his debut in the clubs' first match in the 2020–21 I-League season against Chennai City FC on 9 January 2021. The match ended 1–2 to Chennai City F.C.

Club statistics

References

External links 

 

1995 births
Living people
Indian footballers
I-League players
Gokulam Kerala FC players
Association football goalkeepers
Footballers from Kerala